On 9 November 2018, one male attacker, Hassan Khalif Shire Ali, set his vehicle on fire and stabbed three people at Bourke Street in the Melbourne central business district, Australia, before being fatally shot by Victoria Police. Of the three victims stabbed by Ali, one of the stabbed victims died at the scene while the other two were treated by paramedics and taken to hospital. On 10 November, the Victorian Premier Daniel Andrews confirmed that the attack was "an act of terror" and is being treated as such by counter-terrorism police from both the Victoria Police and the Australian Federal Police. Police also confirmed that the attack was Islamic State-inspired.

Incident 
On 9 November 2018, at around 4:20 pm, a man set fire to a Holden Rodeo ute on Bourke Street between Swanston and Russell Streets, in the Melbourne central business district. The attacker emerged from the vehicle before it burst into flames. Police stated that there were propane gas cylinders in the vehicle, but they did not explode.
The man then went on a stabbing spree with a large knife and wounded three pedestrians, one of whom was later pronounced dead at the scene.  The attacker was then confronted by two Victoria Police patrol officers who arrived at the scene. A member of the public also attempted to ram a shopping trolley into the attacker.  After slashing at the police officers, the attacker was shot once in the chest by one of the officers. The attacker was then disarmed and restrained by Critical Incident Response Team (CIRT) members utilising less lethal tactics before being taken to receive medical treatment under guard, but later died in hospital.

On 10 November, the day following the attack, Victorian Premier Daniel Andrews confirmed that "what we saw yesterday was an act of terror." The Guardian has described that he has expressed confidence in the Victoria Police to ensure the safety of Melbourne. Officers from both the Victoria Police and from the Australian Federal Police were involved in a counter-terrorism investigation.

Perpetrator 
Police identified the attacker as 30-year-old Hassan Khalif Shire Ali, who moved to Australia from Somalia in the 1990s with his parents and siblings and attended Al-Taqwa Islamic College. He was married with a young son.

The Chief Commissioner of Victoria Police, Graham Ashton, told the media that the attacker was known to federal intelligence agencies but was not actively monitored. The Australian Federal Police's acting national manager of counter-terrorism said Hassan's passport was cancelled in 2015 when the Australian Security Intelligence Organisation believed he was planning to travel to Syria to fight for the ISIL terrorist group, but he was never a target of joint counter-terrorism taskforce investigations as they did not believe he was a threat. Relatives and acquaintances have described Hassan as having mental health and substance abuse issues, being delusional and agitated prior to the attack, and complaining of "being chased by unseen people with spears."
 
Hassan's 21-year-old younger brother, Ali Khalif Shire Ali, was arrested in November 2017 for planning to commit a mass shooting at Melbourne's New Year's Eve celebration. Ali Khalif pled guilty to preparing a terrorist attack and in May 2020, he was sentenced to ten years jail, with a seven and a half years non-parole period. In December 2020, Ali Khalif's sentence was increased to sixteen years, with a non-parole period of twelve years.

Victims 
Sisto Malaspina, aged 74, was killed when the perpetrator stabbed him above his collar bone. Eyewitnesses said it appeared Malaspina was walking over to the car after it burst into flames to offer assistance when he was stabbed. A former nurse tried to revive him by performing CPR, but the knife had severed a major artery resulting in exsanguination (death due to traumatic blood loss). Malaspina was the co-owner of Pellegrini's Espresso Bar, a nearby Italian coffee bar. Flowers, messages and photos have been laid in front of the shop as a tribute.

The other two people injured were a 58-year-old retired businessman from Launceston, Tasmania, who suffered knife injuries to the head and was taken to the Alfred Hospital for surgery and a 24-year-old security guard from Hampton Park who received lacerations and was taken to the Royal Melbourne Hospital after being assessed by Ambulance Victoria paramedics.

Aftermath
On 12 November, Victorian Premier Daniel Andrews, who described Sisto Malaspina as a "Victorian icon", announced that Malaspina's family had accepted his offer of a state funeral. The City of Melbourne also confirmed it was considering suggestions to rename Crossley Lane, which corners Pellegrini's in honour of Malaspina, telling The Age that "In the coming weeks, the City of Melbourne will consider a range of measures to recognise the life of Sisto Malaspina."

See also
January 2017 Melbourne car attack
December 2017 Melbourne car attack

References

2018 crimes in Australia
2018 fires in Oceania
2018 stabbing attack
Filmed killings
Fires in Australia
Islamic terrorism in Australia
Islamic terrorist incidents in 2018
2018 stabbing attack
November 2018 crimes in Oceania
November 2018 events in Australia
Stabbing attacks in 2018
Stabbing attacks in Australia
Terrorist incidents in Oceania in 2018
Terrorist incidents in Australia in the 2010s
Terrorist incidents involving knife attacks